Paul Balmi was the third Bishop of Northern Karnataka of the Church of South India:

Notes

 

Church of South India clergy
Indian bishops
Indian Christian religious leaders
Anglican bishops of Northern Karnataka